Alla Grishchenkova (born 27 August 1961) is a Russian former butterfly swimmer who competed in the 1980 Summer Olympics.

References

1961 births
Living people
Russian female butterfly swimmers
Olympic swimmers of the Soviet Union
Swimmers at the 1980 Summer Olympics
Olympic bronze medalists for the Soviet Union
Olympic bronze medalists in swimming
Medalists at the 1980 Summer Olympics
Soviet female butterfly swimmers